The Crooks Covered Bridge is a single span Burr Arch Truss structure that crosses Little Raccoon Creek built in 1855-1856 by Henry Wolf just southeast of Rockville, Indiana.

History
The exact history of this bridge has become hazy with the passing of time. A couple of different sources give varying years as to when certain things may have happened; what is consistent is that the bridge was moved from its original location sometime after 1863 maybe due to the road being abandoned. Some claim that the bridge actually washed downstream to its new location where new abutments were put under it and a road built to it. Still others claim that because the creek changed its course the bridge had to be dismantled and moved. Yet another claim is that General Arthur Patterson, one of the founders of Rockville,  had the bridge rebuilt by J.J. Daniels in 1867 after a viewing committee, which included Daniels, recommended it be rebuilt. Daniels also recommended moving the bridge to the Darroch's Site because it was thought to be safe from flooding. This proved false though when the bridge had to be repaired in 1875 after being damaged by flooding.

It was added to the National Register of Historic Places in 1978.

Gallery

See also
 List of Registered Historic Places in Indiana
 Parke County Covered Bridges
 Parke County Covered Bridge Festival

References

External links

Parke County Covered Bridge Festival

Covered bridges on the National Register of Historic Places in Parke County, Indiana
Bridges completed in 1856
Wooden bridges in Indiana
Burr Truss bridges in the United States